A jabot , also called cascade or tail, is a vertical pleated piece of window treatment used with festoons or swags along the top of a window on the inside of a building.  The usual purpose of a jabot is to hide the seams between individual swags, though for treatments with only one swag their purpose is simply decorative (unlike most curtains, jabots do not serve to block the passage of light).
  Visually, they represent a continuation of the swag over the ends of a pole, and are always made of the same decorator fabric on the facing side as the swag itself.  Jabots are often lined, however with a different style or color of fabric which is then revealed along its bottom edge with each pleat.

See also
 Jabot (neckwear)

References

Interior design